is a Japanese actress, television personality and former singer, signed under the entertainment agency Horipro. She is best known for her affiliations with AKB48 and its various sister- and subgroups. Between 2006 and 2016, she was a part of the promoting line up of 33 AKB48 and 4 SKE48 single releases.

Music career

2006–2012: AKB48
After being rejected during the first audition for AKB48, Miyazawa auditioned again in February 2006 in an applicant pool of about twelve thousand aspiring idols. This time, she was selected as one of the 19 girls for AKB48's newly created Team K, which made its stage debut on April 1, 2006. She stayed with Team K and AKB48 until August 2012.

During this period, Miyazawa participated in the title tracks of 25 of the 27 AKB48 single releases, missing only the A-sides of "Chance no Junban" and "Ue kara Mariko", for which the featured members were determined by a rock-paper-scissors-tournament. In October 2011, she was named the AKB48 member with the most appearances in the popular music show Music Japan on NHK, with 34 performances. Although this underlines her role as one of the promotional fixtures of the group at that time, she did not reach the popularity level of fellow members like Atsuko Maeda or Oshima Yuko. Within her time in the group, she became a member of two AKB48 side projects: Chocolove from AKB48 was established in 2007 as a trio with fellow AKB48 members Sayaka Akimoto and Rina Nakanishi. The group released two singles and an album, but disbanded in 2008 following Nakanishi's departure from AKB48. In 2011, AKB48 announced that she and Akimoto would be part of another spin-off called Diva, along with Ayaka Umeda and Yuka Masuda. Following the departure of Akimoto and Masuda, Diva was disbanded in late 2014, after releasing a farewell single and album.

In January 2011, an exhibition of her self-portraits was held at the AKB48 Official Shop in Hong Kong, She then visited Hong Kong on January 28, and attended a series of events, including an AKB48 Cosplay Event held in Dragon Centre in Kowloon. In March 2012, during AKB48's trip to the National Cherry Blossom Festival, Miyazawa visited the Strong John Thomson Elementary School in Washington, D.C., to explain Japanese pop culture to the pupils.

2012–2015: SNH48 and SKE48
In August 2012, it was announced that Miyazawa and fellow AKB48 member Mariya Suzuki would be transferred overseas to help lead Shanghai-based sister group SNH48. This transfer was initially scheduled to last six to twelve months, while the affected members were still affiliated with AKB48, as "Team Abroad" (海外, kaigai). Because she and Suzuki did not have working visas for China, they rarely appeared with SNH48; for instance, they only appeared as audience members for the group's first public performance. They however did appear together as group representatives at the Japanese Night at the Summer Davos in Tianjin, China, and were mentioned in the official diary of the Japanese prime minister. During the opening ceremony of SNH48's theater in Shanghai in September 2013, group officials announced that Miyazawa would begin to perform with the group on October 11, 2013. Indeed, both Miyazawa and Suzuki debuted with SNH48 on that date, triggering media coverage in both Japan and China. Her endeavors as a Japanese idol in a Chinese environment made the Japanese Ministry of Education, Culture, Sports, Science and Technology name Miyazawa a representative for the "Tobitate! Ryugaku Japan"-campaign ("Take off! Study abroad!").

In January 2013, during the annual "Request Hour" concerts held by all Japanese AKB48 acts, the Miyazawa-led song "Kiseki wa Mani Awanai" ranked second in fan voting.
Following this, Miyazawa promoted AKB48's 30th single "So Long!" in TV broadcasts, even though she did not participate in the actual single recording. In March 2013, Miyazawa started a Twitter account, but this was suspended when it gathered too many followers on the first day; her Twitter was reopened two days later. Meanwhile, Miyazawa took part in AKB48's 31st single "Sayonara Crawl".

During the AKB48 Group Rinji Sokai concert in Nippon Budokan in April 2013, AKB48 announced her return to Team K and concurrent membership with SNH48. In the 2013 AKB48 general election, she finished tenth overall. During the election results event, she declared her plans to focus on SNH48, and after confirmation with AKB48 management, became the first AKB48 member to voluntarily drop concurrency. As a result, she did not participate in the rock-paper-scissors tournament in 2013 and rarely appeared with the group until February 2014, when AKB48 announced Miyazawa's transfer to Nagoya-based SKE48 at the Grand Reformation Festival, while staying a concurrent member of SNH48. She was appointed the 'leader' of SKE48's Team S. This time, she accepted the new position after learning of the transfer via a live phone call from that event. However, she suffered a significant decrease in popularity in the process, as she lost over 21000 votes compared to 2013 in the 2014 AKB48 general election, but still managed to maintain the 12th position overall. In SKE48, Miyazawa appeared frequently as one of the leading members in commercial campaigns, TV and stage performances, and had since then been selected to appear in AKB48's 38th single, her first regular single appearance since Sayonara Crawl, and her 29th title track performance overall. In the general election for the 41st single in 2015, she recovered from the heavy loss in 2014, by adding 31,000 votes to her result and ranking in at the 8th position, her personal best. Before the event, she stated that she would not be participating in future fan elections. By the end of 2015, she had appeared in 32 single A-sides of AKB48, trailing only five other members. Kuchibiru ni Be My Baby, AKB48's 10th anniversary single, marked her return to the main selection of promoting members of AKB48 releases. It was her first appearance in a management selected conventional line up of 16 members since Give Me Five! in 2012, before her transfer to SNH48.

2016: Departure from 48 Group
During the nationwide broadcast of the music show "FNS", Miyazawa announced her departure from SKE48 and SNH48 at an undefined date in 2016. She is the second member to announce her so-called "graduation" from the group on national TV, after Oshima Yuko on Kōhaku Uta Gassen in 2014. Following this, the Miyazawa-centered song "Kiseki wa Mani Awanai" was voted into the first place in the 2016 edition of the Request Hour concert series. During this event, a two-day concert at Nippon Gaishi Hall dedicated to her farewell was announced. She eventually left the group  in March 2016, after farewell performances in the theaters of all three groups she was affiliated with (SNH48, SKE48, AKB48).

Solo activities and acting career
As a member of the AKB48 group, Miyazawa has been promoted in many of AKB48's own shows, but also frequently appeared in Japanese radio and TV. She has published two photobooks; one in 2009 titled "Kanojo" and one in 2015 titled "Namida no Yukue". Occasionally, she was cast as an actress for feature films, stage plays and Japanese TV dramas. In January 2014, Miyazawa was selected to play a major role in the stage play , the 13th volume of the Gorgeous Earth series, which was performed in Tokyo, Osaka, Nagoya, and Fukuoka. In July 2014, it was announced that she would play the male lead role in the stage adaption of the manga "AKB49: Ren'ai Kinshi Jōrei". 2014 ended with her being cast in ntv's special primetime drama "Dr. Nurse Aid" (Dr.ナースエイド) in November.
In March 2015, she performed in the gala concert celebrating the 20th anniversary of the stage play series Gorgeous Earth, she appeared in 2013/2014. Some months later, it was announced that Miyazawa would perform in the stage adaptation of the popular shōjo manga "Crest of the Royal Family" by Chieko Hosokawa, scheduled for 2016. She was cast for the role of the main protagonist, sharing the role with Seiko Niizuma.
After finishing the play, Miyazawa collaborated with the cosplay boy group ARSMAGNA on their single Kibun Joujou, and concluded the year by scoring a main role in the TV Asahi drama Ossan's Love. She also appeared in a number of TV variety programs, for example Hirunandesu! and Rôkaru rosen basu noritsugi no tabi.
In July 2018, Miyazawa terminated her contract with Flave Entertainment, and signed to media agency Horipro Entertainment a year later. In between she was on a hiatus from entertainment. As of 2019, Miyazawa has become a regular musical actress, having appeared nationwide in a number of successful stage plays, with her most recent signing as a double cast with accomplished Japanese singer May J. in the Japanese run of West Side Story.

Reception
Miyazawa, who is often called "Sae-chan" (さえちゃん) by fans and media, belonged to the most popular members of the 48 group family with consistent high finishes in audience polls. In the AKB48 general elections, in which the lineup (called "senbatsu") for a given single is decided by fan voting, she placed 14th (2009), 9th (2010), 11th (2011), 11th (2012), 10th (2013), 12th(2014), and 8th (2015), respectively, which gave her a spot on the related title tracks. She is one of five members to make it to the senbatsu ranks in the first seven elections. Miyazawa and Sayaka Akimoto were frequently referred to as the "Twin Towers" of Team K, because of their comparably tall height and their key roles in that team. Another nickname she bears is "Genking" (from Japanese "genki" = energetic, cheerful), as she is often portrayed as loud, impulsive and energetic. She is also known as AKB48's "handsome idol" (Japanese: "ikemen idol") due to her tomboyish mannerisms and image. Accordingly, she was named as the idol best suited to act male roles and stereotypes in a 2017 survey among college students. Among members of the AKB48 groups, a disproportionately high fraction of her fan following is female.

In the animated series AKB0048, the character Miyazawa Sae The 10th / Asamiya Youko is modeled after her, voiced by Mai Nakahara.

Discography

AKB48

Main singles

Albums 
Song participiations aside from single title track recordings:

 Koko ni Ita Koto (2011), 4 songs
 1830m (2012), 2 songs
 Tsugi no Ashiato (2014), 4 songs
 Koko ga Rhodes da, Koko de Tobe! (2015), 2 songs

Team Surprise 
She participated in the first two incarnations of Team Surprise, a subunit formed for a Pachinko machine campaign, but was not selected for the third:

Other singles participation 
 " - What can I do for someone?" (2011)
 "" (2011)
 "" (2013)
 "Enjoy your life!" (2013), on Tomomi Kasai's second single release, "Mine"
 "", on Love Crescendo first single release ""

SKE48

Main singles

Chocolove from AKB48

Diva

ARSMAGNA 

 Kibun Joujou as SAE TOKIMIYA

Filmography

Movies

TV dramas

Television (Excerpts) 

Aside of numerous appearances in most of the group's house shows (most notably AKBingo!,
AKB to ××!, SKE48 Ebisho!, or SKE48 EbiCalcio), Miyazawa is also frequently appearing  in Japanese variety shows.
The following non-exhaustive list includes shows she recurrently appeared in and otherwise notable shows, both as a Tarento or representing the group.

Radio

Other stage performances

Bibliography

Magazines
 Samurai ELO, Inforest (January 2011-December 2013)

Photobooks
 Kanojo (Kodansha, 21 August 2009) 
 Namida no Yukue (Wani Books, 16 February 2015)

References

External links 
 Flave Entertainment Profile  
 Official blog  
  
 Official web presence 

1990 births
Living people
Singers from Tokyo
Japanese idols
AKB48 members
SNH48 members
Mandarin-language singers of Japan
Japanese women pop singers
21st-century Japanese women singers
21st-century Japanese singers
21st-century Japanese actresses